Ganesan or Ganeshan is a Tamil male given name. Due to the Tamil tradition of using patronymic surnames it may also be a surname for males and females. The name is derived from the Hindu god Ganesh.

Notable people

Given name
 Anayampatti S. Ganesan, Indian musician
 C. Ganesan, Indian politician
 D. Ganesan, Indian politician
 Dhanpal Ganeshan (born 1994), Indian footballer
 I. Ganesan, Indian politician
 K. C. Ganesan, Indian politician
 L. Ganesan (born 1934), Indian politician
 La Ganesan, Indian politician
 N. Ganesan (1932–2015), Singaporean football administrator
 P. Ganesan, Indian politician
 S. Ganesan, Indian politician
 S. A. Ganesan, Indian politician
 Saw Ganesan (1908–1982), Indian politician
 Susi Ganeshan, Indian film director

Surname
 Ganeshan Venkataraman (born 1932), Indian physicist
 Gemini Ganesan (1920–2005), Indian actor
 Mano Ganesan (born 1959), Sri Lankan trade unionist and politician
 Praba Ganesan (born 1964), Sri Lankan politician
 Ramkumar Ganesan, Indian film producer
 Rekha Ganesan (born 1954), Indian actress
 Savitri Ganesan (1936–1981), Indian actress
 Sivaji Ganesan (1928–2001), Indian actor
 Suriaprakash Ganesan (born 1982), Malaysian cricketer
 V. P. Ganesan, Sri Lankan trade unionist and film producer

See also
 
 
 

Tamil masculine given names